Ebrahim Alizadeh is a Kurdish communist politician, an Iranian opposition political party. He is the official spokesperson of the Komala Kurdistan's Organization of the Communist Party of Iran (Komalah), and at the same time the first secretary of Komalah.

References

External links
Official Website 

Iranian communists
Kurdish communists
Komala Party of Iranian Kurdistan politicians
Kurdish socialists
Kurdish Marxists
Living people
Year of birth missing (living people)